Kjetil Bjerkestrand (born 18 May 1955 in Kristiansund, Norway) is a Norwegian musician (keyboards), composer, arranger and record producer, known as music arranger for artists like Ray Charles, Dee Dee Bridgewater, Keith Emerson, Ian Hunter, Jon Lord, Ute Lemper and a-ha. As a musician, he has participated in recordings with a-ha, Ray Charles, Ute Lemper, Ian Hunter, Dance with a Stranger, DumDum Boys, Jonas Fjeld Band, Marius Müller, TNT, Arve Tellefsen, Bobbysocks, Bjørn Eidsvåg, Carola Häggkvist and Dee Dee Bridgewater.

Career 
As the son and grandson of organists, playing the organ came naturally to Bjerkestrand and he started early to compose music as well. He composed music for several films and television series, many of them in collaboration with Magne Furuholmen under the name Timbersound. He received Gammleng-prisen in 1988 in the class facility, and for the music to the TV series Hotel Oslo he received Edvard Prize 1998 in the class Other form of art, together with Magne Furuholmen. He has produced albums for Anne Grete Preus, a-ha, Lynni Treekrem and Herborg Kråkevik. Along with the saxophonist Tore Brunborg, he has released two albums with Christmas music and hymns. He arranged the music for concerts by Sissel Kyrkjebø in Salt Lake City, in front of The Mormon Tabernacle Choir and Orchestra.

In 2009 Bjerkestrand composed music for the play Sangen om den røde rubin, based on the novel by the same name, together with Anne Grete Preus. In 2010 he released his first solo album Piano Poems on the label Kirkelig Kulturverksted.

Honors 
Gammleng-prisen 1988 in the class facility
Edvard Prize 1998 in the class Other form of art, together with Magne Furuholmen, for the TV series Hotel Oslo

Film music 
1987: Veiviseren, with Nils-Aslak Valkeapää & Marius Müller
1993: Hodet over vannet
1994: Ti kniver i hjertet, with Magne Furuholmen
1996: Eremittkrepsen, short Film	
1997: Hotel Oslo, with Magne Furuholmen – (TV series)
1998: Solan, Ludvig og Gurin med reverompa
1998: 1732 Høtten, with Magne Furuholmen
2001: Øyenstikker, with Magne Furuholmen
2002: Karlsson på taket
2005: Deadline Torp, (TV series)
2005: 37 og et halvt, with Bent Åserud & Geir Bøhren
2006: Lange flate ballær
2010: PAX, with Dhafer Youssef & Eivind Aarset

Discography 
1994: Ti kniver i hjertet (film music for Ti kniver i hjertet), with Magne Furuholmen
1995: Gull, Røkelse og Myrra (Kirkelig Kulturverksted), with Tore Brunborg
1997: Prima Luna (Kirkelig kulturverksted), with Tore Brunborg
1997: Hotel Oslo (music for the TV series Hotel Oslo), with Magne Furuholmen
1998: Hermetic (Rune Grammofon) (film music for 1732 Høtten), with Magne Furuholmen & Freddie Wadling
2001: Dragonfly (film music for Øyenstikker), with Magne Furuholmen
2010: Piano poems (Una Corda) (Kirkelig Kulturverksted)

References

External links 
Diskografi fra diskografi.no
Diskografi fra discogs.com

Norwegian composers
Norwegian male composers
Norwegian record producers
Rune Grammofon artists
Musicians from Kristiansund
Living people
1955 births
Norwegian male pianists
21st-century pianists
21st-century Norwegian male musicians